During the existence of Yugoslavia various public holidays were celebrated throughout or in some parts of the country. The most significant changes in the official calendar occurred in the aftermath of the World War II in Yugoslavia when the pre-war Kingdom of Yugoslavia was succeeded by the new Federative People's Republic of Yugoslavia.

Kingdom of Yugoslavia
 1 December - Unification Day
 various dates - King's Birthday

SFR Yugoslavia State holidays 

State (federal) holidays were:

 1-2 January - New Year's Day
 1-2 May - Labour Day
 9 May - Victory Day
 25 May - Youth Day
 4 July - Fighter's Day
 29 November - Republic Day

Republic holidays 

Republic holidays were celebrated in republics:

 27 April - Day of the Liberation Front which was renamed the Day of the Resistance Against the Occupier (SR Slovenia)
 7 July - Day of the uprising of the people of Serbia (SR Serbia)
 13 July - Day of the uprising of the people of Montenegro (SR Montenegro)
 22 July - Day of the uprising of the people of Slovenia  (SR Slovenia)
 27 July - Day of the uprising of the people of Croatia and Day of the uprising of the people of Bosnia and Herzegovina (SR Croatia and SR BiH)
 2 August - First session of ASNOM (SR Macedonia)
 11 October - Day of the uprising of the people of Macedonia (SR Macedonia)
 1 November - Day of the Dead (SR Slovenia)
 25 November - First session of ZAVNOBiH (SR BiH)

See also
 Public holidays in Serbia
 Public holidays in Croatia
 Public holidays in Bosnia and Herzegovina
 Public holidays in North Macedonia
 Public holidays in Slovenia
 Public holidays in Montenegro
 Public holidays in Kosovo

References

External links
 International conference State and National Holidays in the former Yugoslavia between the nineteenth and twenty-first centuries, 14 April 2014, University of Ljubljana& Slovenian Academy of Sciences and Arts

Events in Yugoslavia
Yugoslavia
Yugoslavia